Arab Chegini (also Romanized as ‘Arab Chegīnī; also known as A‘rāb Chegenī) is a village in Paskhan Rural District, in the Central District of Darab County, Fars Province, Iran. At the 2006 census, its population was 1,196, in 264 families.

References 

Populated places in Darab County